Ameropa Holding is a Swiss agribusiness, headquartered in Binningen, Switzerland, that engages in the global distribution of fertilizers and grains. The company was founded in 1948 by Arthur Zivy and his son, Felix Zivy. Andreas Zivy is the chairman of the company. It has operations in over 30 countries across all continents.

History
Arthur and his son, Felix Zivy, founded Ameropa in 1948. In the beginning, the company focused on the import of grains into Europe and the export of European fertilizers to the United States. In the same year, a subsidiary was established in Austria under the name Prochaska & Cie.

In the 1950s, Ameropa entered the South American grains market and obtained the European Agency for wheat and corn sales from Association de Cooperativas Argentinas. As one of the earliest companies, Ameropa began importing Brazilian soybeans into Europe in 1959.

In the 1970s, Ameropa established its second subsidiary, AgriNégoce, in France. By 2007, AgriNégoce employed over 130 people and had sales of over 120 million euros. In 2016, AgriNégoce was sold to the French agricultural company Axéréal.

In the early 1990s, Ameropa expanded its operation to Germany, Hungary, Slovakia, Russia, Belarus, China, and Brazil. Andreas Zivy, the son of Felix Zivy, was appointed CEO of the company in 1995. In 1997, Ameropa was a founding partner of the chemical trading company Kolmar, which was later on sold to Kolmar's management.

The company provided US$70 million to MagIndustries to develop its potash project in the Republic of Congo in June 2008. At the time, the company also had a 9.4% shareholding in MagIndustries. The largest acquisition by the company was concluded in 2012, when Ameropa Holding acquired the Romanian nitrogen fertilizer factory Azomures and the Constanța Port Terminal, Chimpex.

By the end of 2016, the company had expanded operations to 31 countries including distribution centers in various countries, for example Serbia, Romania, Hungary, Australia, and the US.

References

External links
Official Website

Agriculture companies of Switzerland
1948 establishments in Switzerland